The Sherman Tavern, near Sherman, Kentucky, was built in about 1840.  It was listed on the National Register of Historic Places in 1979.

It was deemed notable as "a good example of the popular version of a three-part Greek Revival composition featuring a recessed pedimented porch. The structure has historical interest in being one of the mid-19th century taverns on the Lexington-Covington Road, one of the first macadamized roads in Kentucky."

The listing included three contributing buildings.

The property is said to have had 10 slave cabins, which no longer exist.

See also 
 Gaines Tavern History Center: Walton, Kentucky
 Old Stone Tavern: Frankfort, Kentucky
 Old Talbott Tavern: Bardstown, Kentucky
 National Register of Historic Places listings in Grant County, Kentucky

References

Commercial buildings on the National Register of Historic Places in Kentucky
Commercial buildings completed in 1840
National Register of Historic Places in Grant County, Kentucky
Slave cabins and quarters in the United States
Drinking establishments on the National Register of Historic Places in Kentucky
Taverns in the United States
1840 establishments in Kentucky
Greek Revival architecture in Kentucky